Kujtim Majaci (20 March 1962 - 14 July 2009) was an Albanian football player.

Club career
He played for Apolonia Fier for his entire career, playing around 300 league games and scoring 174 goals, making him the club's highest goalscorer. He was also a member of the Albania national team, earning 3 senior caps.

International career
Majaci made his debut for Albania in a January 1989 friendly match against Greece and has earned a total of 3 caps, scoring no goals.

His final international was a November 1990 UEFA Euro 1992 qualification match against France.

Death
He died of a heart attack in July 2009, aged 47, after collapsing on Seman Beach near Fier. In his honour, a statue was erected in Fier.

References

External links

1962 births
2009 deaths
Sportspeople from Fier
Association football forwards
Albanian footballers
Albania international footballers
KF Apolonia Fier players
Kategoria Superiore players